Tuomas Ketola (born 21 February 1975) is a Finnish former professional tennis player on the ATP Tour.

Career
Ketola was the number two tennis player in Finland behind Jarkko Nieminen and reached a career high doubles ranking of 76 on October 19, 1998.  In 2005, he reached the first round of Wimbledon in singles by defeating three opponents in the qualifying matches. However, he lost his first round main draw match to Álex Calatrava.

Career finals

Doubles (1 runner-up)

See also
List of Finland Davis Cup team representatives

References

External links
 
 
 

1975 births
Living people
Finnish male tennis players
Sportspeople from Turku